Ivan Ivanovich Mozer (born 21 December 1933 in Mukachevo; died 2 November 2006 in Moscow) was a Soviet football player, coach and director.

Honours
 Soviet Top League winner: 1956, 1958.
 Soviet Cup winner: 1958.

International career
Mozer made his debut for USSR on 1 July 1956 in a friendly against Denmark.

External links
  Profile 

1933 births
2006 deaths
People from Mukachevo
Soviet footballers
Soviet Union international footballers
FC Spartak Moscow players
Soviet football managers
FC Shinnik Yaroslavl managers
FC Dynamo Moscow managers
FC Dinamo Minsk managers
FC Dinamo Minsk players
Soviet Top League players
Association football midfielders
Sportspeople from Zakarpattia Oblast